Melvin Giovanie Lim (born May 23, 1986) is an Indonesian actor who began his career starring in the Indonesian horror film  "Lawang Sewu: Kuntilanak's Vengeance".

Career
Giovanie began his movie career in 2007 by starring in the horror film "Lawang Sewu: Kuntilanak's Vengeance" produced by MD Pictures. In 2008, he has also starred in the horror film "The Ghost Train of Manggarai" directed by Nayato Fio Nuala, and the comedy film "Vote for Love" alongside Nadia Saphira and Jessica Iskandar where he played as Anto, a campus journalist with annoying nature. Other than big screen movies, Giovanie has also played many roles in television film (TV Movie) and appeared as a model in the music videos of favorite Indonesian and Malaysian bands and singers, such as D'Masiv, Anuar Zain, and many other.

Filmography

Film

Television film

Short film

Music video

Music video appearances

Advertisement

TV ads

References

Bibliography

External links
 Official Website
 
 

Living people
1986 births
Male actors from Jakarta
Indonesian people of Chinese descent
Indonesian male film actors
21st-century Indonesian male actors
Indonesian actors